The Carlton County Courthouse in Carlton, Minnesota, United States, is the county seat of Carlton County, Minnesota.  The county seat was originally located in Cloquet, with a jail located at the town of Northern Pacific Junction.  In 1890, residents of Northern Pacific Junction raised funds to build a courthouse, which was a two-story brick building with a high-pitched gable roof.  The current building took about two years to build, being completed in 1924.  It is a three-story building with cream-colored brick and stone.

The Carlton County Vidette praised Clyde Kelly, the architect, with these words: "Unquestionably, the man who assumes the responsibility of being the architect for a building like this is entitled to great consideration.  To him is left the superintending of the placing of every stock and stone in the building ... to make the structure as perfect as possible."

References

Buildings and structures in Carlton County, Minnesota
County courthouses in Minnesota
Courthouses on the National Register of Historic Places in Minnesota
Government buildings completed in 1922
Renaissance Revival architecture in Minnesota
National Register of Historic Places in Carlton County, Minnesota
1922 establishments in Minnesota